Camp 9 (also known as Italian Internee Camp No. 9) was one of three main prisoner of war (POW) and internee camps, located at Loveday, in South Australia's Riverland, approximately 8 kilometres from Barmera. This camp could hold up to 1000 people, detaining Italian civilian internees, and later Italian prisoners of war. The camp began operations on 12 August 1940, and the first Italian POW arrived at the camp on 11 June 1941. The camp guard was provided by members of 25/33 Garrison Battalion, a militia unit of the Australian Army. Many internees were released from the camp in 1944.

See also
 List of POW camps in Australia
 Loveday Camp 10
 Loveday Camp 14

External links
 Segment from SA Life re the Loveday camps
 Details of Loveday Camp 9
 Australian National Archives factsheet about Loveday POW & Internee Camp, South Australia
 Loveday research project: Japanese civilians interned in Australia

World War II internment camps in Australia
World War II prisoner-of-war camps in Australia
Military camps in Australia
Riverland